Arthur Brooke may refer to:

Arthur Brooke (poet) (died 1563), English poet
Sir Arthur Brooke, 1st Baronet (1726–1785), Irish MP for Fermanagh, 1761–1783, and Maryborough
Arthur de Capell Brooke (1791–1858), British baronet and travel writer
Sir Arthur Brooke, 2nd Baronet (1797–1854), British MP for Fermanagh, 1840–1854
Arthur Brooke (entrepreneur) (1845–1918), British founder of The Brooke Bond Tea Company
Arthur Brooke (British Army officer) (1772–1843), Anglo-Irish lieutenant-general
Arthur Brook (cricketer) (1844–1917), English cricketer
Arthur Harold John Brook (1907–1985), English brewer

See also
Arthur Brooks (disambiguation)
Arthur Brooke Faulkner (1779–1845), Irish physician and author